Bosch is an American police procedural streaming television series produced by Amazon Studios and Fabrik Entertainment starring Titus Welliver as Los Angeles Police Department detective Harry Bosch. The show was developed for Amazon by Eric Overmyer, and the first season takes its inspiration from the Michael Connelly novels City of Bones (2002), Echo Park (2006), and The Concrete Blonde (1994). It was one of two drama pilots that Amazon streamed online in early 2014 (together with The After), and viewers offered their opinions on it before the studio decided whether to place a series order. The seventh and final season was released on June 25, 2021. Amazon announced another season, produced for IMDb TV as part of rebrand to Amazon Freevee, to be retitled as Bosch: Legacy, in January 2022, and it premiered on May 6, 2022, and was renewed for a ninth season prior to the season premiere.

Plot

Season 1

In the pilot, a dog finds a human bone, which turns out to belong to the skeleton of a small boy who was horribly abused and beaten, then buried in the woods. The second episode introduces Raynard Waits, a serial killer who confesses to the murder in the bones case and has a strange fascination with Bosch, who disbelieves the confession. After Waits escapes custody he begins to taunt Bosch as Bosch aims to both recapture Waits and solve the murder of the boy.

Season 2

Six months after the events in Season 1, Bosch returns from a suspension. He investigates the murder of a Hollywood producer who appears to have mob connections. His investigation of the producer sends him to Las Vegas, where he also finds out that all is not well with his teenage daughter and ex-wife. Bosch's investigation almost threatens the life of his family as he is also brought into another case that leads to a ring of dirty cops. New evidence appears on the death of his mother, which causes him to investigate the circumstances leading to her murder.

Season 3

Sixteen months later. Bosch is haunted with new leads to pursue on his mother's murder case. The season opens with a graffiti-tagging street urchin being in the vicinity where a homeless veteran, Billy Meadows, is murdered. Bosch also finds himself a suspect in the murder of Ed Gunn (a person who fits the MO of his mother's killer), doggedly pursued by veteran Detective Jimmy Robertson. Concurrently, Bosch is monitoring an ongoing criminal trial involving a powerful Hollywood movie mogul who is under house arrest. Under the director's employ is a former 20+ year police detective who proves to be a meddlesome and worthy adversary against Bosch and LAPD. Also, Bosch's personal life takes on new challenges with his daughter, Maddie, living in LA with him, along with a budding romantic relationship with the deputy DA. Adding to the complexity is the introduction of a serial murderer known as the Koreatown Killer (KTK).

Season 4

Three months later. Civil rights attorney Howard Elias is representing a black man who is accusing LAPD of police brutality, but Elias is murdered. Elias had a history of representing citizens who sue the LAPD, and the case produces racial strife in LA and elevated tension between the LAPD and citizens. Police Chief Irving assigns Bosch to head the task force to get to the bottom of the Elias murder and assigns a pair of IA investigators to watch Bosch's team, which includes Edgar, Robertson, and Robertson's detective trainee. Bosch's ex-wife is pursuing a gang of Chinese nationals, one of whom is under an FBI investigation. The investigation leads to her being murdered in a drive-by shooting seconds after lunch with Harry. Bosch gains a vital clue into his mother's murder after the long-retired detective of his mother's case is killed.

Season 5

Fifteen months later. A murder conviction is brought into question from an old case Bosch worked, possibly affecting other past convictions and endangering his career. An embittered former girlfriend accuses Bosch of planting evidence and believes a claim of new DNA evidence purporting to tie another criminal to the crime. Bosch hires former foe Honey ("Money") Chandler to defend him against charges of planting evidence. Bosch and Jerry are investigating the murder of a pharmacist who has, through his son, been involved in dispensing opiates. During their investigation they determine there is a significant opiate dealing network, possibly controlled by Russian and Armenian gangsters. Bosch goes undercover to learn more about their organization.

Maddie Bosch works as an intern in the LA DA's office. A young attorney mentions a case against her father. Maddie observes bad intent from the CIU investigator, Bosch's former girlfriend, and relays her suspicions to her dad.

Chief Irving is frustrated by Bosch's lack of communication about the murder, the old case with newly discovered evidence and his undercover work. Lt. Billets covers nicely for Bosch, risking her own position. Irving is approached by Mayor Vargas's political consultant with the news that he could be a serious contender in the next mayoral election.

Season 6

Eleven months later. After a medical physicist is executed and the deadly radioactive material he had with him goes missing, Detective Harry Bosch finds himself at the center of a complex murder case, a messy federal investigation, and a possibly catastrophic threat to Los Angeles—the city he has pledged to serve and protect.

Season 7

Four months later, New Year's Eve 12/31/19. When a ten-year-old girl dies in an arson fire, Detective Harry Bosch risks everything to bring her killer to justice despite opposition from powerful forces. Detective Jerry Edgar falls apart as he grapples with the consequences of shooting Jacques Avril. Maddie assists Honey Chandler on a high-profile case that draws Bosch in and puts them in the crosshairs of dangerous criminals.

Production
Amazon Studios announced on October 31, 2013, that Bosch had been given the green light for production. The hour-long pilot stars Titus Welliver as Harry Bosch, and co-stars Annie Wersching, Amy Aquino, and Jamie Hector. Henrik Bastin of Fabrik Entertainment was the producer, and Jim McKay directed.

According to Connelly, "a fair [number] of changes" were made "to the world of Harry Bosch" "in making the shift from page to screen." In the television series, Harry "is 47 years old and a veteran of the first Gulf War in 1991," when he was a member of a Special Forces team clearing tunnels, but "he has now been a police officer for twenty years, with a one-year exception when he re-upped with the Army after 9/11, as many LAPD officers did. He came back to the force after serving in Afghanistan and again encountering tunnel warfare."

On November 4, 2013, the 13-day shoot began in Los Angeles, while Connelly kept a daily set journal.

The pilot premiered on Amazon Prime in February 2014, to allow customers to vote to decide whether or not more episodes should be made. In March 2014, Amazon announced that they had commissioned Bosch for a full series.

All ten episodes of the first season of Bosch were released for viewing on Amazon Video on February 13, 2015. Portions of the first episode were changed from the pilot, including the addition of Mimi Rogers to the cast to replace Amy Price-Francis as plaintiff's attorney Honey Chandler and the addition of a scene in which Bosch testifies in court and is questioned about his background by Chandler.

On March 18, 2015, Bosch was renewed for a second season. On July 16, the series was nominated for the Outstanding Main Title Design award at the 67th Primetime Creative Arts Emmy Awards, along with Manhattan, American Horror Story: Freak Show, Daredevil, Halt and Catch Fire, and Olive Kitteridge; the award was won by Manhattan.

On April 1, 2016, Bosch was renewed for a third season. On October 16, 2016, Bosch was renewed for a fourth season. On February 13, 2018, Bosch was renewed for a fifth season. On November 14, 2018, Bosch was renewed for a sixth season.

On February 13, 2020, the series was renewed for a seventh and final season. The filming for the final season began in September 2020, before wrapping up in January 2021.

Cast

Main cast
 Titus Welliver as Los Angeles Police Department Detective III Hieronymus (Harry) Bosch, a former Army Special Forces operator and a veteran of the First Gulf War and Afghanistan who works in the Hollywood homicide division. He is an astute detective with a fundamental respect for rules and policy, though still something of a renegade. Welliver's son Quinn plays adolescent Harry in flashbacks.
 Jamie Hector as Detective II Jerome (Jerry) Edgar, Bosch's partner
 Amy Aquino as Lieutenant II Grace Billets, Bosch's immediate superior and friend
 Lance Reddick as Chief of Police Irvin Irving
 Annie Wersching (season 1; guest seasons 2 & 7) as Police Officer I Julia Brasher, a rookie cop assigned to the Hollywood Division. She becomes romantically involved with Bosch but comes into conflict with him when he realizes that she makes up the rules as she goes along
 Jason Gedrick (season 1) as Raynard Waits, a serial killer and the suspect in the death of a boy whose bones are found in Laurel Canyon
 Sarah Clarke (seasons 1–2 & 4; guest season 3) as Eleanor Wish, Harry's ex-wife with whom he still has a cordial relationship.  She is a former FBI Agent turned professional poker player.
 Madison Lintz (recurring season 1; main seasons 2–7) as Madeline (Maddie) Bosch, Harry's daughter
 Jeri Ryan (season 2; featured season 3; guest season 5) as Veronica Allen, a manipulative former porn star married to an Armenian porn producer who is murdered
 Brent Sexton (season 2) as Carl Nash, a former LAPD homicide detective who oversees a team of corrupt police officers while working as a security guard at a gated community
 Mimi Rogers (recurring seasons 1–6; main season 7) as Honey "Money" Chandler, a civil rights attorney
 Paul Calderón (recurring seasons 3–5; main season 7) as Detective II Santiago "Jimmy" Robertson, a seasoned detective investigating the murder of a vet who has a history with Harry

Recurring cast
 Steven Culp as Richard (Rick) O'Shea, the politically ambitious district attorney of Los Angeles County (seasons 1–4)
 Gregory Scott Cummins as Detective II Robert Moore ("Crate"), Barrel's longtime friend and partner
 Troy Evans as Detective II Johnson ("Barrel"), a senior homicide detective at Hollywood Division
 Scott Klace as Sergeant II John "Mank" Mankiewicz, assistant watch commander at Hollywood Division
 DaJuan Johnson as Police Officer III, later Detective I Rondell Pierce
 Jacqueline Obradors as Detective Christina Vega (seasons 5–7)
 Deji LaRay as Police Officer III, later Sergeant I Julius Edgewood
 Eric Ladin as Scott Anderson, a reporter for the Los Angeles Times (seasons 3, 5–7)
 Bess Armstrong as Judge Donna Sobel (seasons 5–7)
 Mark Herrier as Captain III Dennis Cooper (seasons 5–7)
 Jason Sims-Prewitt as Police Officer Victor Rhodes
 Joni Bovill as Ida, assistant to Chief of Police Irvin Irving

Season 1
 Katharine Leonard as Marjorie Lowe, shown in flashbacks as Harry's deceased mother.  She was a prostitute found murdered in an alley
 Abraham Benrubi as Rodney Belk, a lawyer who represented Bosch at his trial (seasons 1, 7)
 Veronica Cartwright as Irene Saxon, Raynard Waits' mother
 Mark Derwin as Captain Harvey Pounds (seasons 1, 7)
 Shawn Hatosy as Johnny Stokes
 Robbie Jones as Officer George Irving, Deputy Chief Irving's son, a rookie cop later assigned to undercover narcotics (seasons 1–2)
 Adam O'Byrne as Nate Tyler, an aggressive Los Angeles Times reporter
 Paul Vincent O'Connor as Judge Alan M. Keyes, a judge who presided at Bosch's trial.
 Rose Rollins as Detective Kizmin Rider
 Alan Rosenberg as Dr. William Golliher (seasons 1, 7), a forensic anthropologist who assisted Bosch with the identification of the bones
 Scott Wilson as Dr. Paul Guyot, a retired doctor whose dog found bones of a missing boy
 Michelle Hurd (season 1) and Erika Alexander (seasons 2–3) as Connie Irving, Deputy Chief Irving's wife and Officer George Irving's mother, who later divorces Irving believing that he caused their son's death by allowing him to go undercover
 Kirk Bovill as Harry's foster father in flashbacks during his childhood

Season 2
 Yancey Arias as Los Angeles Mayor Hector Ramos (seasons 2–4, 6)
 Ingrid Rogers as Latonya Edgar, Jerry's ex-wife (seasons 2-)
 Hoon Lee as Reggie Woo, Eleanor's husband and Maddie's step-father who is currently in Hong Kong (seasons 2, 4)
 John Marshall Jones as FBI Special Agent Jay Griffin (seasons 2–4)
 Ryan Ahern as Officer Ray Powers (seasons 2-)
 Matthew Lillard as Luke "Lucky" Rykov, an FBI agent with whom Harry works on two cases (seasons 2–3, 7)
 David Marciano as Detective Brad Conniff, investigates the death of Officer Irving. (seasons 2–3, 5–6)
 Leisha Hailey as Officer Maureen (Mo) O'Grady, a cop in Nash's ring
 James Ransone as Officer Eddie Arceneaux, Irving's partner and a cop in Nash's ring
 Emilia Zoryan as Layla, the stagename of a dancer at Dolly's in Las Vegas, Nevada, and mysterious girlfriend to an Armenian porn producer who is murdered.
 Christopher Cousins as Martin Weiss, an attorney to one of the Armenian mobsters involved in the case
 Michael Yebba as Mike, an enforcer for the Armenian mob in Las Vegas

Season 3
 Winter Ave Zoli as Detective Amy Snyder, Internal Affairs (seasons 3–4)
 Barry Shabaka Henley as Detective Terry Drake (seasons 3–4)
 John Getz as Bradley Walker, president of the Police Commission (seasons 3–4)
 Linda Park as Jun Park, the crisis response team volunteer who starts a relationship with Chief Irving after his wife leaves him. (seasons 3-)
 Verona Blue as Shaz, bartender at The Smog Cutter (seasons 3–5)
 Monti Sharp as Clifton Campbell, perpetrator of the Koreatown Killer (KTK) murders (season 3–4)
 John Ales as Andrew Holland, a movie writer/director accused of murder
 Max Arciniega as Xavi Moreno, a sniper who is part of Dobbs' team
 Christopher Backus as Woody Woodrow, part of Dobbs' team
 Beth Broderick as Judge Sharon Houghton
 Frank Clem as Ed Gunn
 Spencer Garrett as Fowkkes, Andrew Holland's high-powered attorney (seasons 3, 7)
 Jeffrey Pierce as Trevor Dobbs, leader of a team of former military men transiting illicit cargo through the Port of Los Angeles
 Brooke Smith as Captain Ellen Lewis, Hollywood Station
 Paola Turbay as Deputy District Attorney Anita Benitez, who is trying the Holland case, and has a brief relationship with Harry
 Jared Ward as Jesse Tafero, Rudy's younger brother and helper
 Arnold Vosloo as Rudy Tafero, an investigator working for the defense on the Holland case
 Bridger Zadina as Sharkey, a young street boy who is key to one of Harry's cases

Season 4
 Clark Johnson as Howard Elias, civil rights attorney who was murdered aboard the Angels Flight two days before the "Black Guardian" case
 Tamberla Perry as Detective Gabriella Lincoln
 Anne Dudek as Pamela Duncan, legal advisor and lover of Howard Elias
 Jamie McShane as Detective Francis Sheehan, a detective with Robbery-Homicide Division
 Louis Ozawa Changchien as FBI Special Agent Chuck Deng
 Anna Diop as Desiree , a young activist who has a disdain for the police
 Sara Arrington as Margaret Sheehan, estranged wife of Francis Sheehan
 Deidrie Henry as Millie Elias, wife of Howard Elias
 David Hoflin as Detective Doug Rooker
 Keston John as Michael Harris, suspect in the abduction and murder of Stacey Kincaid. After being found not guilty of the murder, he retained Howard Elias to sue the city of Los Angeles for police brutality from his interrogation by the LAPD.
 Kristen Ariza as Laura Cooke, reporter (seasons 4, 6)
 Leonard Wu as Shiwei Chen
 Jason Rogel as Det. Jeremy Fix

Season 5
 Ryan Hurst as Hector Bonner, a former client of attorney Honey Chandler, currently working as her investigator.
 Mason Dye as Tom Galligan
 Judith Moreland as DA Cheryl Hines (seasons 5, 7)
 M. C. Gainey as Ryan Rodgers (seasons 5–6)
 Bianca Kajlich as DA Investigator Christina Henry
 Chris Browning as Preston Borders
 Juliet Landau as Rita Tedesco
 Jon Lindstrom as Lance Cronyn
 Avery Clyde as Kathy Zelden
 Doug Simpson as Terry Spencer
 Chris Vance as Dalton Walsh
 Jamie Anne Allman as Elizabeth Clayton (seasons 5–6)
 C. Thomas Howell as Louis Degner
 Yani Gellman as Jose Esquivel Jr.
 Kevin Sifuentes as Jose Esquivel Sr.
 Rene Moran as Oscar Pineto
 Celestino Cornielle as Charlie Hovan (seasons 5–6)
 Kwame Patterson as Gary Wise
 Sam Meader as Sean Terrion (seasons 5–6)
 Mark Adair-Rios as DDA Kennedy (seasons 5–6)
 Richard Brooks as Dwight Wise (seasons 5–6)
 Treva Etienne as Jacques Avril (seasons 5–6)
 Wilmer Calderon as Detective Daniel Arias (seasons 5–6)
 Al Vicente as Detective Ray Marcos (seasons 5–6)

Season 6
 Kovar McClure as Dr. Stanley Kent
 Lynn Collins as Alicia Kent
 Julie Ann Emery as FBI Agent Sylvia Reece (seasons 6–7)
 Adam J. Harrington as FBI SAC Jack Brenner (seasons 6–7)
 Carter MacIntyre as FBI Agent Clifford Maxwell
 Abby Brammell as Heather Strout
 Kevin Will as Waylon Strout
 Chris Payne Gilbert as Travis Strout
 Leith M. Burke as Charlie Dax
 Mary-Bonner Baker as DDA Hannah Blair
 Benjamin Burt as Ben Craver
 Jon Fletcher as Alex Sands
 Tzi Ma as Brent Charles
 Ashton Holmes as Roger Dillon
 Jonny Rios as Antonio Valens
 D. W. Moffett as Jack Killoran
 Mitchell Fink as Ray Thacker
 Bambadjan Bamba as Remi Toussaint
 Brian D. Mason as Winston
 Terrence Terrell as Marvel

Episodes

Home media 
In Australia (Region 4), the first four seasons have been released on DVD and distributed by Universal Sony Pictures Home Entertainment Australia Pty Limited.

Reception

Critical response
On Rotten Tomatoes, the first season has a rating of 83% based on 30 reviews, with an average rating of 7.1/10. The site's critics' consensus reads: "An uneven boilerplate police drama is sharpened by gritty atmosphere, solid acting, and some rousing, suspenseful turns." On Metacritic, the season has a weighted average score of 71 out of 100, based on 17 critics, indicating "generally favorable reviews".

Cory Barker of TV.com wrote that the series is "rock-solid and generally enjoyable without ever making much of an attempt to push boundaries," and praised Amazon Studios for "producing a show based on a book that somehow reproduces the experience of reading." Neil Genzlinger of The New York Times wrote that the series is part of a long "list of brooding, taciturn small-screen police detectives," yet Bosch "proves gripping" due to good "plotting and pacing".
Noel Murray of The A.V. Club remarked that "the best thing about Bosch is how well it captures Connelly's Los Angeles," while noting that "the series' biggest stumbling block is that it's stubbornly slow-paced". Brian Lowry of Variety wrote that "the series has the texture and tone of an old-fashioned detective yarn," but "the transition from page to screen… proves too talky in places and clunky in others". Hank Stuever of The Washington Post called Welliver's performance "nicely built out of smirks and smolders". Brian Moylan of The Guardian praised the "film noir" feeling of the show and considered it a step above NCIS, but he did not like the similarities to many other police shows, calling the series "samey".

On Rotten Tomatoes, season two has an approval rating of 100% based on 14 reviews, with an average rating of 7.67/10. The site's critical consensus reads: "Bosch hones its pulpy strengths in a superlative sophomore season, executing its procedural formula with a no-nonsense panache that befits its title character." On Metacritic, the season has a weighted average score of 76 out of 100, based on 7 critics, indicating "generally favorable reviews". Season three has an approval rating of 100% based on 10 reviews, with an average rating of 8/10. The critical consensus reads: "Boschs third season maintains the series' mastery over mystery, deftly interweaving story strands as sprawling as a Los Angeles intersection." Season four also holds an approval rating of 100% based on 10 reviews, with an average rating of 8/10. The critics' consensus reads: "Bosch continues its steady thrills in a fourth season that successfully navigates topical controversies." Seasons five, six and seven hold approval ratings of 100% (based on 6, 11 and 8 reviews respectively).

Accolades

Spin-off/revival

A spin-off/revival with Titus Welliver reprising his role as Harry Bosch was ordered by Amazon's advertising-supported streaming service Amazon Freevee in March 2021. Madison Lintz returns as Harry's daughter, Maddie, and Bosch recurring character defense attorney Honey "Money" Chandler, played by Mimi Rogers, is also a main character. Bosch, now retired from the LAPD, works as an investigator for Chandler, while Maddie joins the LAPD. The series is produced by Welliver, Erik Overmyer, Henrik Bastin, Pieter Jan Brugge and writer Michael Connelly, all of whom produced Bosch. The series began filming in June 2021 in Los Angeles.

In November 2021, the series's title, Bosch: Legacy was announced. In March 2022, it was announced that the series would premiere on May 6, 2022. In May 2022, the series was renewed for a second season.

References

External links
 

2010s American crime drama television series
2020s American crime drama television series
2014 American television series debuts
2021 American television series endings
Amazon Prime Video original programming
American detective television series
Fictional portrayals of the Los Angeles Police Department
Television series by Amazon Studios
Television shows based on American novels
Television shows filmed in Los Angeles
Television shows set in Los Angeles